The Spanish Sessions is a 4-track EP independently released in 1999 by Andy Taylor and Luke Morley.  The release came on the heels of a small UK tour in late 1999 billed as 'An Evening With Luke Morley and Andy Taylor'. The EP was the first release of new material from Andy Taylor since 1990's Dangerous. Two of the songs ("Lightning" and "Sleeping with the Past") were sung by Andy, the other two by Morley.  All four songs written by Taylor/Morley.  Backing vocals were by sisters Anna and Tara McDonald.

Track listing
All tracks composed by Andy Taylor and Luke Morley
"Quiet Life"
"Lightning"
"Can't Stop the Rain"
"Sleeping with the Past"

Personnel 
Andy Taylor – lead vocals on "Lightning" and "Sleeping with the Past", guitar
Luke Morley – lead vocals on "Quiet Life" and "Can't Stop the Rain", guitar, bass
Gary "Harry" James – drums
Benny Mathews – piano, organ
The McDonald Sisters (Anna McDonald and Tara McDonald) - backing vocals

1999 debut EPs
Andy Taylor (guitarist) albums
Self-released EPs